Trommsdorffia may refer to:
 Trommsdorffia Bernh., 1800, a genus of flowering plants in the family Asteraceae; synonym of Hypochaeris
  Trommsdorffia Mart., 1826, nom. illeg., replaced by Pedersenia (Amaranthaceae, Plantae)